Dan Tepfer (born 1982 in Paris, France) is a French-American jazz pianist and composer. He is best known for his 2011 album Goldberg Variations/Variations and his 2019 multimedia project Natural Machines.

Biography
Dan Tepfer grew up in Paris, France in a musical and scientific family. He received a bachelor's degree in astrophysics from the University of Edinburgh and a master's degree in jazz piano performance from the New England Conservatory in Boston. He currently lives in Brooklyn, New York, where he works as a pianist and composer. He tours around the world, with frequent appearances in Europe in particular. Since 2009, he has released a series of critically acclaimed  recordings on Sunnyside Records and Verve Records, working in trio, duo and solo formats. He is also known since 2007 as one of the most frequent collaborators of jazz icon Lee Konitz.

Awards and honors 
 2006: First Prize and Audience Prize, Montreux Jazz Festival Bösendorfer Solo Piano Competition
 2007: Winner of American Pianists Awards and Cole Porter Fellowship in Jazz, American Pianists Association
 2011: CHOC Jazz Magazine (France) for "Goldberg Variations / Variations"
 2011 – 2013: Rising Star Pianist, Down Beat
 2012 – 2013: Rising Star Pianist, JazzTimes
 2014: Charles Ives Fellowship, American Academy of Arts and Letters
 2016: MacDowell Fellowship, MacDowell Colony
 2017: CHOC Jazz Magazine (France) for "Eleven Cages"
 2018: Fondation BNP-Paribas 3-year artistic development award

Discography 
 2005: Before the Storm, with Richie Barshay and Jorge Roeder (DIZ)
 2007: Oxygen, with Richie Barshay and Jorge Roeder (DIZ)
 2009: Twelve Free Improvisations in Twelve Keys (DIZ)
 2009: Duos with Lee, duo with Lee Konitz (Sunnyside)
 2010: Five Pedals Deep, with Thomas Morgan and Ted Poor (Sunnyside)
 2011: Goldberg Variations/Variations (Sunnyside)
 2013: Small Constructions, with Ben Wendel (Sunnyside)
 2014: First Meeting: Live in London, Volume 1 with Lee Konitz, Michael Janisch & Jeff Williams (Whirlwind)
 2017: Eleven Cages, with Thomas Morgan and Nate Wood (Sunnyside)
 2018: Decade, duo with Lee Konitz (Verve)
 2019: Natural Machines, with real-time musical and visual algorithmic response (Sunnyside)
 2023: Inventions / Reinventions ([StorySound Records])

With Billy Hart
 Sixty-Eight (SteepleChase, 2011)

Film Score
 Movement+Location

External links 
 Dan Tepfer Official Website
 [https://www.dailymotion.com/video/x2ytdgp French documentary of Konitz and Tepfer European tour
 NPR Tiny Desk Concert

References

1982 births
Living people
Musicians from Paris
New England Conservatory alumni
Alumni of the University of Edinburgh
Sunnyside Records artists